The Galwan River flows from the disputed Aksai Chin area administered by China to the Union Territory of Ladakh, India. It originates near the caravan campsite Samzungling on the eastern side of the Karakoram range and flows west to join the Shyok River. The point of confluence is 102 km south of Daulat Beg Oldi. Shyok River itself is a tributary of the Indus River, making Galwan a part of the Indus River system.

The narrow valley of the Galwan River as it flows through the Karakoram mountains has been a flashpoint between China and India in their border dispute. In 1962, a forward post set up by India in the upper reaches of the Galwan Valley caused an "apogee of tension" between the two countries. China attacked and eliminated the post in the 1962 war, reaching its 1960 claim line. In 2020, China attempted to advance further in the Galwan Valley, leading to a bloody clash on 16 June 2020.

Etymology 
The river is named after Ghulam Rasool Galwan (1878–1925), a Ladakhi explorer and caravan manager of Kashmiri descent, who accompanied numerous expeditions of European explorers. The river appears with the Galwan name in Survey of India maps from 1940 onwards.
(It was earlier unlabelled.)

Folklore holds that in the 1890s, Galwan was part of a British expedition team exploring north of the  Chang Chenmo valley, and when the team got caught in a storm Galwan found a way out through the Galwan valley. Harish Kapadia notes that this is one of the rare instances where a major geographical feature was named after a native explorer.

Geography 

At the eastern edge of this 30 mile range, marked by the Samzungling camping ground, the main channel of the Galwan river runs north–south, but several other streams join it as well. To the east of Samzungling, the mountains resemble an elevated plateau, which gradually slopes down to the Lingzi Tang Plains in the east. To the west of Samzungling lie numerous mountains of the Karakoram range, the majority of which are drained by the Galwan river through a multitude of tributaries.

At the northeastern edge of the Galwan River basin, the mountains form a watershed, sending some of their waters into the Karakash River basin. The watershed between the two river basins is difficult to discern, as noted by British cartographers.

To the south of the Galwan river, the Karakoram range divides into two branches, one that lies between the Kugrang and Changlung rivers (both tributaries of Chang Chenmo), and the other to the east of Changlung.

Travel routes 

The narrow gorge of the Galwan river prohibited human movement, and there is no evidence of the valley having been used as a travel route. Samzunling however formed an important halting point of a north–south caravan route (the westernmost "Changchenmo route") to the east of Karakoram range. One reaches Samzungling from the Changchenmo valley by following the channel of the Changlung river and crossing over to the Galwan river basin via the Changlung Pangtung La Beyond Samzungling, one follows the Galwan channel to one of its sources, after which the Lingzi Tang plain is entered. The next halting point on the caravan route is Dehra Kompas. Thus the upper Galwan Valley formed a key north–south communication link between the Chang Chenmo valley and the Karakash River basin.

In modern times, the Chinese Wen Jia Road traverses this route up to the Galwan River. The eastern route through Nischu now carries the Tiankong Highway (Tianwendian–Kongka highway) and a new Galwan Highway links the two.

Sino-Indian border dispute 

There is no evidence of Qing China making any claims on the Aksai Chin plateau. The Republic of China (1912–1949), having faced a revolution in Tibet in 1911, apparently made secret plans to acquire Aksai Chin plateau in order to create a road link between Xinjiang and Tibet. These plans began to get manifested in public maps only towards the end of its rule.
While the Republican Chinese claims included the Aksai Chin proper, they stopped at the foot of the Karakoram mountains, leaving all the rivers that flow into the Shyok River within India. (See map.) Communist China also published the "Big Map of the People's Republic of China" in 1956 with a similar boundary, now called the 1956 claim line. In the Galwan Valley, this line just skirted the Samzungling campsite, leaving the rest of the valley within India.

However, in 1960 China advanced its claim line to the western end of the Galwan river, running along the crest of the mountain ridge adjoining the Shyok river valley. The Chinese said little by way of justification for this advancement other than to claim that it was their "traditional customary boundary" which was allegedly formed through a "long historical process". They claimed that the line was altered in the recent past only due to "British imperialism".

Meanwhile, India continued to claim the entire Aksai Chin plateau.

1962 standoff 

These claims and counterclaims led to a military standoff in the Galwan River valley in 1962.

The Indian Intelligence Bureau proposed in September 1961 that the Galwan Valley should be patrolled and posts established up in the valley because it was strategically connected to the Shyok Valley. Nehru supported the proposal and the CGS B. M. Kaul ordered the setting up of a forward post. However, the terrain of the valley proved too difficult for the troops to proceed up the valley. In April 1962, Kaul ordered that a southern route should be tried. By this time, the Chinese had announced that they were resuming patrols and it was also learnt that they had established a post at Samzungling. The Western Command's objections that the establishment of an Indian post would be a provocative act were overruled by the high command.

A platoon of Indian Gorkha troops set out from Hot Springs in the Chang Chenmo Valley, and, by 5 July, arrived at the upper reaches of the Galwan Valley. They established a post on a ridge overlooking the valley from the south, on the bank of a tributary that China calls "Shimengou".
The post ended up cutting the lines of communication to a Chinese post downstream along the Galwan River, called 'Day 9'. The Chinese interpreted it as a premeditated attack on their post, and surrounded the Indian post, coming within 100 yards of it.
The Indian government warned China of "grave consequences" and informed them that India was determined to hold the post at all costs. The post remained surrounded for four months and was supplied by helicopters.
The Central Intelligence Agency opined that the presence of the post temporarily blocked any further movement of the Chinese troops down the Galwan Valley.

Scholar Taylor Fravel states that the standoff marked the "apogee of tension" for China's leaders.
A regimental level headquarters was organised under the chief of staff of the 10th Regiment to assume control of the Chinese forces in the Galwan region. Both Chairman Mao Zedong and the Chinese government were monitoring the situation at the highest level. Termed 'armed coexistence', detailed guidance was issued to the troops on the ground:

The commanders at the front were ordered to report any unexpected situation arising, and ask for instructions without taking initiative on their own accord.

Nevertheless, sporadic firing incidents occurred throughout the western front. At Galwan Valley itself, fire was exchanged on 2 September. As a result of the standoff, the Chinese were compelled to withdraw some of the posts in the Galwan Valley because they could not be supplied. Indian leaders saw this as a sign of success for their forward policy.

1962 war 

By the time the Sino-Indian War started on 20 October 1962, the Indian post had been reinforced by a company of troops. The Chinese PLA bombarded it with heavy shelling and employed a battalion to attack it. The garrison suffered 33 killed and several wounded, while the company commander and several others were taken prisoner. By the end of the war, China is said to have reached its 1960 claim line. There is however no evidence that the Chinese troops trekked through the Galwan Valley to reach their claim line.
The elimination of the sole Indian post in the Galwan Valley (near the tributary called Shimengou) implied that they had control up to their claim line. The Indian post at the confluence of Galwan with the Shyok River was intact throughout the war and the Chinese never made any contact with it.

The Chinese later claimed, implicitly, via a map annexed to a 1962 letter from then Chinese premier Zhou Enlai to heads of certain Afro-Asian nations, that they had reached the confluence of Galwan with the Shyok River. However, the Afro-Asian nations, in their Colombo proposals for truce between China and India, drew the line very close to China's 1960 claim line. The Chinese still persist with the line on their maps, calling it the "Line of Actual Control of 1959".

Infrastructure 

Prior to the 1962 war, China had already constructed a road linking its bases at Kongka Pass and Heweitan. There was also a feeder road leading to the Samzungling area and covering the southern tributaries such as Shimengou.

Following the war, there was no further activity in the Galwan Valley from either India or China, till about 2003. Between 2003 and 2008, China embarked on a large-scale infrastructure development exercise in the run-up to the Beijing Olympics. Starting in 2010, the Aksai Chin Road (G219) was repaved at a cost of $476 million.
Along with it, numerous improvements to the border infrastructure within Aksai Chin also became visible.
The existing road to the Heweitan military base was improved and extended under a new name "Tiankong Highway". The feeder road into Galwan Valley was also upgraded to a paved all-weather road and renamed the "Galwan Highway".

India also commissioned a road link to Daulat Beg Oldi (DBO) at its northern frontier in 2001, scheduled to be completed by 2012. The road would start from the Shyok village and run along the western bank of the Shyok River and then move on to Depsang Plains near Murgo. The initial road did not meet the all-weather requirement, and it had to be rebuilt on an improved alignment later. The road was eventually completed in 2019 and named the Darbuk–Shyok–DBO Road (DS-DBO Road).
India also built a military outpost near the confluence of Galwan with the Shyok River, called 'KM 120'. It is said to have been a source of discomfort to China.

2020 standoff 

China is said to have initiated the construction of a large number of "supporting facilities" in the Galwan Valley in September 2019.
These would include dams, bridges, camping grounds and power lines along the existing Galwan Highway, as well as an effort to extend the highway further towards the Line of Actual Control.

In April 2020, India started its own construction efforts to build a feeder road off the DS-DBO Road, along the last 4–5 km stretch of Galwan Valley on its side of the LAC. According to Zhao Lijian, the Chinese Foreign Ministry spokesman, Indian forces started "unilaterally" building roads and bridges in the "Galwan region". They are said to have persisted with their efforts despite repeated protests from China, which allegedly "intensified cross-border troubles".
The Indian Army chief dismissed the complaints, saying, "There is no reason for anyone to object. They are doing development on their side, we are doing development on our side."

The problem for China was that its own roadway was still quite far from the LAC.
On 5 May 2020, China initiated a standoff by deploying troops in tented posts all along the Galwan Valley.
The Chinese also brought in heavy vehicles and monitoring equipment, presumably in an effort to accelerate the road construction.
And the Chinese government mouthpiece Global Times initiated a high-pitched rhetoric.
India responded by moving its own troops to the area in equal measure.
The Chinese eventually set up a post at a 90-degree bend in the river, close to the official LAC, which the Indians regarded as Indian territory and a patrol point (PP-14). The bend was to eventually become the new border.

To create a roadway through the narrow valley, the Chinese bulldozers dug out earth from the cliff sides, and used it to dredge the river bed. The river was constrained to flow in a narrow channel so that the rest of the river bed could be used for traffic and encampments.

Eventually, the standoff led to a violent clash on 15 June near PP-14 in Galwan Valley. Twenty Indian Army soldiers and an unknown number of Chinese soldiers were killed.
The causes of the clash remain unclear, but there had been reports, starting 10 June, of a "limited pull-back" agreed by the two sides by 1 to 2 kilometres from the confrontation site.
According to a detailed report published by India Today the Chinese had reneged on the agreement and reinstated a post at PP-14, which led to a series of brawls on 15 June, lasting till midnight and causing deaths on both sides.
A US Congressional review alleged that the Chinese government had planned the clash including its potential for fatalities.

Following the clash, both the sides resumed their construction activity. India completed the contested bridge on the Galwan River by 19 June.
China extended its road till India's PP-14 by 26 June, in addition to erecting a full-blown post at the location. The Indians made no attempt to dismantle it a second time.

The final deescalation happened in stages starting 6 July.
With China's occupation of PP-14, the effective LAC in the Galwan Valley has shifted by about one kilometre in China's favour.

In popular culture 
The web series 1962: The War in the Hills is inspired by the events that took place in the Galwan Valley during the 1962 war.

See also 
 Line of Actual Control
 India-China Border Roads
 Sino-Indian border dispute

Notes

References

Bibliography

Further reading 
 Galwan, Ghulam Rassul (1923), Servant Of Sahibs, Cambridge, 
 Pranab Dhal Samanta, Galwan River Valley: An important history lesson, The Economic Times, 29 June 2020.

External links
 Galwan River basin marked on OpenStreetMap, retrieved 16 October 2020.
 Galwan Highway, Galwan Valley Road marked on OpenStreetMap, retrieved 16 October 2020.
 Xicagou Highway and Wen Jia Road marked on OpenStreetMap, retrieved 16 October 2020.
 Claude Arpi,  Latest Developments in the Aksai Chin (covers the Heweitan post of China), 6 October 2013.

Tributaries of the Indus River
Rivers of Ladakh
Rivers of India
Rivers of Xinjiang
Aksai Chin